Glottiphyllum is a genus of about 57 species of succulent subtropical plants of the family Aizoaceae. It is closely related to the Gibbaeum and Faucaria genera. The name comes from ancient Greek γλωττίς glottis "tongue" and φύλλον phyllon "leaf". The species are native to South Africa, specifically to Cape Province and the Karoo desert. They grow in rocks and soils incorporating slate, sandstone and quartz.

Description
Glottiphyllum plants have thick, soft leaves arranged in pairs that are low to the ground and often graze the soil surface. They also have rhizomes. They sport yellow flowers with narrow petals in the autumn and winter. The flowers are sometimes fragrant and around 5 cm in diameter. The species readily interbreed, making hybridization easy.

Species
Glottiphyllum species accepted by the Plants of the World Online as of November 2022:[1] 
Glottiphyllum carnosum 
Glottiphyllum cruciatum 
Glottiphyllum depressum 
Glottiphyllum difforme 
Glottiphyllum fergusoniae 
Glottiphyllum grandiflorum 
Glottiphyllum linguiforme 
Glottiphyllum longum 
Glottiphyllum neilii 
Glottiphyllum nelii 
Glottiphyllum oligocarpum 
Glottiphyllum peersii 
Glottiphyllum regium 
Glottiphyllum salmii 
Glottiphyllum suave 
Glottiphyllum surrectum

Culture
Glottiphyllum plants can be grown in small pots in poor soil with sand and clay. They require full sun, and need moderate watering in summer and none in winter (during which the plant undergoes a necessary rest period). If overwatered, the plants become deformed.

Gallery of species

References

Bibliography
 Heidrun E. K. Hartmann : Illustrated Handbook of Succulent Plants: Aizoaceae F-Z, Éditions Springer, Berlin/Heidelberg/New York, 2001, 
 Gideon Smith u.a. : Mesembs of the World: Illustrated Guide to a Remarkable Succulent Group, Éditions Springer, 1998, 
 Heidrun E.K. Hartmann, Horst Gölling: A monograph on the genus Glottiphyllum (Mesembryanthema, Aizoaceae). In: Bradleya. Band 11, 1993, S. 1–49

External links

 
Aizoaceae genera
Succulent plants